Daniel J. "Dan" Rafael (born November 16, 1961 in Mont-Laurier, Quebec, Canada) is a Canadian male curler and curling coach. He worked as national curling coach (head coach of national curling federation) and national curling teams coach of France, China, Italy, Czech Republic, Turkey, Russia, Poland.

He grew up and started playing curling in Schefferville, Quebec, where he played his entire junior curling career.

Teams and events

National coach

Record as a coach of national teams

References

External links
 
 
 
 Video:  ("World Curling Tour WCT" YouTube channel; October 7, 2013)

1995 births
Living people
Canadian male curlers
Canadian curling coaches
People from Côte-Nord
People from Mont-Laurier
Curlers from Quebec